Gastrin-releasing peptide, also known as GRP, is a neuropeptide, a regulatory molecule that has been implicated in a number of physiological and pathophysiological processes.  Most notably, GRP stimulates the release of gastrin from the G cells of the stomach.

The gene from which GRP is derived encodes a number of bombesin-like peptides. Its 148-amino acid preproprotein, following cleavage of a signal peptide, is further processed to produce either the 27-amino acid gastrin-releasing peptide or the 10-amino acid neuromedin C. These smaller peptides regulate numerous functions of the gastrointestinal and central nervous systems, including release of gastrointestinal hormones, smooth muscle cell contraction, and epithelial cell proliferation.

Function 

Gastrin-releasing peptide is a regulatory human peptide that elicits gastrin release and regulates gastric acid secretion and enteric motor function. The post-ganglionic fibers of the vagus nerve that innervate bombesin/GRP neurons of the stomach release GRP, which stimulates the G cells to release gastrin.

GRP is also involved in the biology of the circadian system, playing a role in the signaling of light to the master circadian oscillator in the suprachiasmatic nuclei of the hypothalamus.

Furthermore, GRP seems to mediate certain aspects of stress. This is the reason for the observed fact that atropine does not block the vagal effect on gastrin release.

Gene 

The human GRP gene is located on chromosome 18q21. PreproGRP (the unprocessed form of GRP) is encoded in three exons separated by two introns.   Alternative splicing results in multiple transcript variants encoding different isoforms.

Synthesis 

PreproGRP begins with signal peptidase cleavage to generate the proGRP, which is then processed by proteolytic cleavages, to form smaller GRP peptides.

These smaller peptides are released by the post-ganglionic fibers of the vagus nerve, which innervate the G cells of the stomach and stimulate them to release gastrin.  GRP regulates numerous functions of the gastrointestinal and central nervous systems, including release of gastrointestinal hormones, smooth muscle cell contraction, and epithelial cell proliferation.

Clinical significance 

Gastrin-releasing peptide and neuromedin C, it is postulated, play a role in human cancers of the lung, colon, stomach, pancreas, breast, and prostate.

See also
Pro-Gastrin-Releasing-Peptide
Bombesin

References

Further reading

External links
 
 

Neurotransmitters